is the 18th studio album by Japanese singer/songwriter Mari Hamada, released on October 26, 2005 by Meldac/Tokuma Japan. The album was reissued alongside Hamada's past releases on January 15, 2014.

Elan peaked at No. 78 on Oricon's albums chart.

Track listing
All lyrics are written by Mari Hamada; all music is arranged by Hiroyuki Ohtsuki and Mari Hamada.

Charts

Personnel 
 Hiroyuki Ohtsuki – guitar, bass
 Takashi Masuzaki – guitar
 Yōichi Fujii – guitar
 Hiroshi Matsubara – bass
 Takanobu Masuda – keyboards
 Kevin Savigor – keyboards
 Yōgo Kōno – keyboards
 Hiroshi Yamazaki – keyboards
 Hirotsugu Homma – drums

References

External links 
  (Mari Hamada)
 Official website (Tokuma Japan)
 
 

2005 albums
Japanese-language albums
Mari Hamada albums
Tokuma Shoten albums